Agathis moorei is a species of tree, endemic to New Caledonia. It is threatened by habitat loss.

Description

Taxonomy
Agathis corbassonii was previously considered a distinct species but since 2010 has been synonymous with Agathis moorei.

References

Whitmore, T. C. (1980). A monograph of Agathis. Pl. Syst. Evol. 135: 41–69.

moorei
Endemic flora of New Caledonia
Plants described in 1851
Taxonomy articles created by Polbot